Laurie Donald Thomas Ferguson (born 7 July 1952) is a former Australian politician who was an Australian Labor Party member of the House of Representatives from March 1990, representing Reid until 2010 and Werriwa until May 2016, both in New South Wales.

Early life and education
Laurie Ferguson grew up in Guildford, the eldest son of Mary Ellen and Jack Ferguson, who was deputy premier of New South Wales 1976–84. His brother Martin was also a federal MP. Both attended at St Patrick's College, Strathfield. His younger brother, Andrew, was the former NSW Secretary of the Construction Forestry Mining and Energy Union (Construction and General Division).

Ferguson was educated at the University of Sydney and was a research officer with the Federated Miscellaneous Workers' Union before entering politics.

Career
He was the member for Granville in the New South Wales Legislative Assembly 1984–90.

In the federal Parliament, Ferguson was elected to the opposition shadow ministry in March 1996 and was Shadow Minister for Immigration in 2004–05. His handling of the debate around Petro Georgiou's private member's bill on asylum seekers was severely criticised  and he was shifted to Shadow Minister for Consumer Affairs, Population Health and Health Regulation in June 2005. On the election of the Rudd Labor Government in 2007, Ferguson became Parliamentary Secretary for Multicultural Affairs and Settlement Services.

He was preselected to contest the south-western Sydney seat of Werriwa at the 2010 federal election after his existing seat of Reid was merged with neighbouring Lowe. Lowe MP John Murphy contested the redistributed Reid. He was not re-appointed to the Gillard Ministry after the election. Ferguson is a member of the Board of Advisors of the Global Panel Foundation-Australasia.

Personal life
Ferguson is married to Maureen Walsh, a former councillor at Parramatta City Council in the Woodville Ward.

References

External links

 

1952 births
Living people
Australian Labor Party members of the Parliament of Australia
Members of the New South Wales Legislative Assembly
Members of the Australian House of Representatives
Members of the Australian House of Representatives for Reid
Members of the Australian House of Representatives for Werriwa
Australian people of Scottish descent
Politicians from Sydney
People educated at St Patrick's College, Strathfield
University of Sydney alumni
Australian Labor Party members of the Parliament of New South Wales
Labor Left politicians
21st-century Australian politicians
20th-century Australian politicians